Summoned by Bells, the blank verse autobiography by John Betjeman, describes his life from his early memories of a middle-class home in Edwardian Hampstead, London, to his premature departure from Magdalen College, Oxford.

The book was first published in November 1960 by Betjeman's London publishers, John Murray, and was read by the author, chapter by chapter, in a series of radio broadcasts on the Third Programme (later to become Radio Three) of the BBC. A later, illustrated edition with line and water colour illustrations by Hugh Casson was published in 1989 by Murray. A paperback edition appeared in 2001.

There is also a BBC film version directed by Jonathan Stedall for television in 1976. In an autobiography covering the life of Betjeman before he started his first job, narrated in blank verse by him, Betjeman visits places that played an important part in his early life.

Synopsis
Chapter I   Before MCMXIV  —   Memories of the nursery, realisation of class. You could:
looking up socially
But what of us in our small villa row
Who gazed into the Burdett-Coutts estate?
I knew we were a lower lesser world …
looking down socially and geographically
Glad that I did not live in Gospel Oak.

Chapter II   The Dawn of Guilt  —   The author prefers poetry to his father's fascinating workshop; early lines.

Chapter III   Highgate  —   His love for Miss Peggy Purey-Cust; trouble with bullies.
Betjeman's a German spy—
Shoot him down and let him die:

Chapter IV   Cornwall in Childhood  —   To Cornwall by rail, evocative sounds and smells of childhood holidays.

Chapter V   Private School  —   To the Dragon School in Oxford; bicycling to look at church architecture.

Chapter VI   London  —   John's father is doing well, they have moved to Chelsea, "the slummy end"; but he preferred leafy Hampstead.

Chapter VII   Marlborough  —   After a depressing start, the discovery of literature, nature and the Wiltshire Downs; manages poetry better than painting.

Chapter VIII   Cornwall in Adolescence  —   To Cornwall by road, adolescent family troubles, an bicycling independently to explore Cornish churches.

Chapter IX   The Opening World  —   Up to Magdalen College, Oxford, influences, hobnobbing, versifying, failing at Holy Scripture.

Places mentioned in the book
St Ervan (In the cool shade of interlacing boughs, I found St Ervan's partly ruined church…)
Trebetherick
Pembroke College, Oxford
Sezincote

A Ring of Bells
In 1962 Betjeman released an abridged version of the book for children, with illustrations by Edward Ardizzone.

See also
 An Oxford University Chest

References

1960 books
1989 books
British non-fiction books
English books
English poetry books
Books by John Betjeman
Literary autobiographies
Magdalen College, Oxford
University of Oxford in fiction